Sjoerd is a Dutch masculine given name of West Frisian origin. It is derived via Sieuwerd from the Germanic Sigiward ("victory warden"). Sjoerd gained some popularity as a baby name between 1975 and 2005. The spelling Sjoert is far less common.

Notable people named Sjoerd 
Sjoerd Ars (born 1984), Dutch footballer
Sjoerd Bax (born 1996), Dutch cyclist
Sjoerd De Jong, Dutch/Belgian video game level designer
Pieter Sjoerd Gerbrandy (1885–1961), Dutch politician of the Anti Revolutionary Party (ARP)
Sjoerd van Ginneken (born 1992), Dutch racing cyclist
Sjoerd Hamburger (born 1983), Dutch rower who competes in the single scull
Sjoerd Hoekstra (born 1959), Dutch rower
Sjoerd Hofstra (1898–1983), Dutch sociologist and anthropologist working in Africa
Sjoerd Hoogendoorn (born 1991), Dutch volleyball player
Sjoerd Huisman (1986– 2013), Dutch marathon speed skater
Sjoerd Janssen (born 1984), Dutch electronic dance musician, half of the Showtek duo
Sjoerd Joustra (1916–2001), Dutch architect
Sjoerd Koppert (born 1950), Dutch-born recording engineer and producer now based in California
Sjoerd Kuyper (born 1952), Dutch poetry and prose writer
Sjoerd Marijne (born 1974), Dutch field hockey player and coach
Sjoerd Bertus Mooi Wilten (1913–1965), Dutch swimmer
Sjoerd Overgoor (born 1988), Dutch footballer
Sjoerd Potters (born 1974), Dutch VVD politician
Georges (Sjoerd) Romme (born 1960), Dutch professor in organizational theory
Sjoerd de Roos (1877–1962), Dutch type designer, book cover designer and artist
Sjoerd Wiemer Sjoerdsma (born 1981), Dutch diplomat and politician
Sjoerd Soeters (born 1947), Dutch postmodern architect
Sjoerd Vollebregt (born 1954), Dutch sports sailor
Sjoerd Wartena (born 1939), Dutch rower
Sjoerd Wiarda (1399–1410), the fifteenth potestaat of Friesland, now a province of the Netherlands
Sjoerd Winkens (born 1983), Dutch footballer
Sjoerd van Ginneken (born 1992), Dutch racing cyclist

Notable people with variants of the name 

 Sjoerdje Faber (1915–1998), Dutch long-distance speed skater
 Sjoert Brink (born 1981), Dutch bridge player

References

Dutch masculine given names